Exelastis crudipennis is a moth of the family Pterophoridae. It is known from the Congo, Malawi and Uganda.

References

Exelastini
Moths of Africa
Moths described in 1932